Mount Eliza is a seaside suburb on the Mornington Peninsula in Melbourne, Victoria, Australia,  south-east of Melbourne's Central Business District, located within the Shire of Mornington Peninsula local government area. Mount Eliza recorded a population of 18,734 at the 2021 census.

History
The traditional Boonwurrung name for the mount is Berringwallin. The mount was given its European name in 1836 after Captain William Hobson’s wife, Eliza Elliott.

Prior to large scale subdivision, Mount Eliza was mainly a location for holiday homes, with the Mount Eliza Post Office opening on 15 November 1920. This began to change in the early half of the 20th century when many old estates were subdivided. One such subdivision was Ranelagh Estate, designed by Walter Burley Griffin and Marion Mahony Griffin in 1924 in tandem with the surveyors Tuxen and Miller.

Daveys Bay was named after James Davey who constructed a jetty in the 1840s to ship his produce to Melbourne. In 1909 the Daveys Bay Yacht Club was established, and winds its way to a walking track overlooking Mt Eliza Beach on the shores of Canadian Bay, which was named after three Canadians who owned a sawmill in the area in the 1950s. In 1928, the independent girls school Toorak College was built and is one of the oldest independent girls schools in Victoria. By the 1950s the shopping precinct began to develop and by the 1960s was a well established shopping village. Hollywood glamour came to Mt Eliza in 1959 when movie stars Fred Astaire, Gregory Peck and Ava Gardner arrived to shoot the Stanley Kramer film, On The Beach, based on the novel of the same name by British novelist Nevil Shute who had lived at nearby Langwarrin.

Adjacent to Sunnyside beach sits a historical property Morning Star Estate. Morning Star Estate is a distinctive example of a Victorian era mansion built as a rural or holiday retreat on the Mornington Peninsula, it incorporates a number of architectural styles – including Tudor and Gothic Revival.

Sunnyside estate (now Morning Star Estate) was originally purchased by Londoner Francis Alfred Gillett in 1865 a short time after he arrived in the colony in 1853. Gillett designed the Sunnyside mansion sometime around 1867–1870. In 1932 the property was purchased, with funds from a bequest, by the Catholic Church and became known as Morning Star Boys' Home. The boys’ home was developed into a country-training centre for delinquent boys, giving them exposure to the benefits of rural life. The boys later became involved in an extensive building program, which led to further developments of the property. Despite this, the mansion remained the dominant architectural feature of the property.

Renovations and extensions were undertaken by the Franciscans in 1944–1946. Some effort to follow the lead of the mansion was made in the external Tudor/Gothic detailing of the large chapel. A number of courtyards were formed by the new buildings, including a large courtyard which was used for sports and was later enclosed. The remains of a football field lie to the south of the building complex, and a tall angular concrete pillar near the Nepean Highway originally carried a statue of the Virgin Mary sculpted by one of the brothers.

Morning Star Estate has been in a number of films due to its location and historical buildings, including a three-month location shoot around the mansion for the movie Partisan, starring French actor Vincent Cassel, during 2013 and 2014. The mansion was also the location for the Kath & Kim movie spin-off Kath & Kimderella.

Morning Star estate is also home to possibly the largest rose garden in Victoria, and the gardens surrounding the main mansion are home to more than 700 varieties of ornamental roses.

Geography

The suburb is bordered by Kackeraboite Creek, Humphries Road, Moorooduc Highway, Wooralla Drive, the Mornington railway line, Oakbank Road, Manyung Creek and Port Phillip.

There are several beaches and bays located in Mount Eliza, which include Canadian Bay (has had the name since the late 19th Century), Daveys Bay, Half Moon Bay, Moondah Beach, Ranelagh Beach and Sunnyside North Beach.
In addition Mount Eliza is also home to the Moorooduc Quarry Flora and Fauna Reserve and several creeks including Ballar Creek, Earimil Creek (formerly Dennant Creek), Gunyong Creek, Kackeraboite Creek, Manmangur Creek and Manyung Creek (named after the Manyung Fault).

Mount Eliza Village

The suburb’s main shopping area is known as Mount Eliza Village. It is situated at the intersection of Canadian Bay Road and Mount Eliza Way. 

Two major supermarkets, Ritchies Stores Supa IGA and Woolworths can be found along with many specialty shops. There is a range of restaurants from moderately priced restaurants to fine dining.

Education

Secondary schools

Peninsula Grammar
Toorak College
Mount Eliza Secondary College

Primary schools

 Kunyung Primary School
 Mount Eliza Primary School
 Mount Eliza North Primary School
 St. Thomas More Catholic Primary School

Kindergartens

Toorak College Preschool
 Peninsula Grammar Early Childhood Centre
 Guardian Early Learning Centre Mt Eliza
 Mt Eliza Preschool
 Kunyung Preschool
 Woodlands Early Learning Centre
 Walkers Road Preschool
 Mt Eliza House Childcare & Early Learning Centre
 Little Grasshoppers Early Learning Centre Coolstores

There is also another child care centre being built on 1412 Nepean Highway, Mount Eliza VIC 3930 designed by Rauhous

Sport

There are many sporting clubs in Mount Eliza, but most notable is the Mount Eliza Football Club competing in the Mornington Peninsula Nepean Football League.

Mt Eliza Cricket Club which is one of the most successful Cricket Clubs on the Mornington Peninsula with ten First Eleven premierships and a total of more than 55, including the Juniors. During the 1980s the club was heralded as the largest cricket club in Australia with nine senior teams and eight junior teams.

Mount Eliza Soccer Club  was formed in 2008 and has grown rapidly. They cater for all age groups and have approximately 500 members. The club competes in both the Football Federation Victoria Metropolitan League and Bayside League.

Mornington Peninsula Pony Club provides dressage, show jumping and cross-country facilities for young equestrian enthusiasts.  The club  is affiliated with the Pony Club Association of Victoria.

Other sporting clubs include the Mount Eliza Bowls club, the Mount Eliza Tennis Club and the Peninsula Old Boys Football Club which compete in the VAFA.

Davey's Bay Yacht Club is located in Mount Eliza.  The club celebrated its centenary in 2009.

Mount Eliza Skate Park, located in Emil Madsen Reserve, Wooralla Drive, opened in 2012.

Mount Eliza Fire Brigade

Mount Eliza is served by a volunteer fire brigade, part of the Country Fire Authority. The station responds to approximately 250 calls a year within the local area, supporting neighbouring brigades and further afield in the event of large bush fires. The brigade currently has three vehicles, a Scania Type 3 Medium Pumper, a medium tanker for rural fires and a Forward Control Vehicle. Mount Eliza Fire Brigade is part of District 8.

Transport

Mount Eliza is served by two major roadways, the Nepean Highway and Moorooduc Highway.

The Melbourne bus routes 772, 773, 781, 784, 785 & 788 also serve the area.

Notable people
 Sir Reginald Ansett
 Sir Edgar Coles
 Greg Hunt
 Rob Hulls
 Nick Warner PSM AO
 Walter Burley Griffin
 Marion Mahoney Griffin
 Peter Mitchell
 Emilie de Ravin
 Tim Wilson
 Billy Brownless
Dani Venn 
 James Rees
 Sir Laurence Hartnett
 Brooke Satchwell
 Joanna Murray-Smith
 Cameron Daddo
 Andrew Daddo
 Lachie Daddo
 Campbell Clerke
 Grahame Begg
 David Andersen
 Alec Potts
 Mete Erdogan
 Melissa Clarke
 Odette Joannidis
 Sally McLean
 Tim Ross
 Mick Molloy
 Kate Forster
 Summer de Roche
 Andrew Wrigglesworth
 Jean Kittson
 Laura Coates
 Harry Norris
 James Reyne
 Henry Kerley
Ethan Hawkins
 Hazel Chow 
Czulak, Józef Karol (1915–1985)
 Simon Hussey Awarded Songwriter and Record Producer

See also
 City of Frankston (former) – Parts of Mount Eliza were previously within this former local government area.
 Shire of Mornington – Parts of Mount Eliza were previously within this former local government area.
 Simon House, Mount Eliza
 Sunnyside North Beach

References

External links

School websites;
 Kunyung Primary School
 Mount Eliza Primary School
 Mount Eliza North Primary School
 Mount Eliza Secondary College
 The Peninsula School
 St. Thomas Moore Catholic Primary School
 Toorak College
 Mount Eliza / The University of Melbourne Business School.

Sporting Club Websites;
 Davey's Bay Yacht Club
 Mount Eliza Cricket Club
 Mount Eliza Junior Football Club
 Mount Eliza Football Club
 Mount Eliza Soccer Club
 Mount Eliza Tennis Club
 Canadian Bay Club

Community Organisations;
 Australian Institute for the Achievement of Human Potential
 http://www.mountelizaclub.com.au
 Ranelagh Residents' Association Inc.

Suburbs of Melbourne
Suburbs of the Shire of Mornington Peninsula
Port Phillip